Goldston may refer to:
Goldston, North Carolina, town in Chatham County, North Carolina, United States

People
Daniel Goldston (born 1954), American mathematician who specializes in number theory
John Goldston (fl. 1397), English politician
Lori Goldston, American cellist
Ralph Goldston (1929–2011), running back and defensive back in the Canadian Football League
Robert Conroy Goldston (born 1927), American history writer
Will Goldston, (1878–1948), English stage magician
Robert J. Goldston, (born 1950), American physicist

See also
Goldson
Goldstone (disambiguation)